Bogzești is a village in Telenești District, Moldova.

Notable people
 Vasile Mândrescu 
 Mihail Minciună

References

Villages of Telenești District